Thomas Horsman (c. 1536 – 26 November 1610) was an English politician. Son of Thomas Horsman (d. around 1553) and Elizabeth, daughter of Sir Robert Hussey of Blankney.

He was a Member (MP) of the Parliament of England for Grantham in 1593, 1597, 1601 and 1604.

References

1530s births
1610 deaths
English MPs 1593
English MPs 1597–1598
English MPs 1601
English MPs 1604–1611